SpyEye is a malware program that attacks users running Google Chrome, Opera, Firefox and Internet Explorer on Microsoft Windows operating systems. This malware uses keystroke logging and form grabbing to steal user credentials for malicious use. SpyEye allows hackers to steal money from online bank accounts and initiate transactions even while valid users are logged into their bank account.

SpyEye has the ability to insert new fields and alter existing fields when a compromised user's browser displays a web page, allowing it to prompt for user names, passwords, or card numbers, thereby giving hackers information that allows them to steal money without account holders ever noticing. It can save the user's false balance (with fraudulent transactions hidden) so that the next time the user logs in, the fraudulent transactions and real balance are not displayed in the user's browser (though the bank still sees the fraudulent transactions.)

SpyEye emanated from Russia in 2009 and was sold in underground forums for $500+ in which SpyEye advertised features such as keyloggers, auto-fill credit card modules, email backups, config files (encrypted), Zeus killer, HTTP access, POP3 grabbers and FTP grabbers.

Target users and institutions in the United States, United Kingdom, Mexico, Canada and India were the largest victims of SpyEye; the United States made up 97% of the institutions that fell victim of this malware.

Authors of SpyEye
It is believed that the creator of Zeus said that he was retiring and had given the source code and rights to sell Zeus to his biggest competitor, the creator of the SpyEye trojan; those same experts warned the retirement was a ruse and expect the developer to return with new tricks.

In 2016, Aleksandr Andreevich Panin, author of SpyEye, was arrested and sentenced to nine years and six months in prison. 

Hamza Bendelladj, co-author of SpyEye, was arrested and also sentenced to prison for 15 years years; both men were charged for stealing hundreds of millions of dollars from banks all around the world.

References

See also
 Conficker
 Command and control (malware)
 Gameover ZeuS, the successor to ZeuS
 Operation Tovar
 Timeline of computer viruses and worms
 Tiny Banker Trojan
 Torpig
 Zeus (malware)
 Zombie (computer science)

Trojan horses
Windows trojans